Søren Frederiksen may refer to:
 Søren Frederiksen (footballer born 1972), retired Danish footballer
 Søren Frederiksen (footballer born 1989), Danish footballer

See also
Frederiksen (surname)